Werner Wnendt is a German diplomat and politician who served as the Ambassador of Germany to Canada from 2012 to 2017. Until 2007, he was the head of Organization for Security and Co-operation in Europe (OSCE) mission in Kosovo. He was responsible for reporting Kosovo developments to the European Union and OSCE and is considered an expert in Kosovo matters in Western Europe.

External links
 OSCE Report

Notes

Ambassadors of Germany to Canada
Living people
Year of birth missing (living people)